is a 2005 role-playing video game developed and published by Square Enix for mobile phones. Forming part of the Code Age media franchise, the story follows the character "Lost L" as they struggle to survive through an apocalypse brought upon the world by its control system as an imperfectly-created Warhead hybrid. Gameplay sees Lost L fighting other Warhead, absorbing them and using their powers in future combat, with the game featuring multiplayer combat with other players.

The concept for Code Age was created in 2002 by Yusuke Naora, with the development team of Brawls using the project to expand upon the multiplayer communication of Before Crisis: Final Fantasy VII. Miwa Shoda wrote the scenario, while Kumi Tanioka composed the soundtrack. As with the rest of Code Age, Brawls remained exclusive to Japan. It released five story chapters between December 2005 and July 2006, before shutting down in September 2006. Journalists at the time it was demoed highly praised the demo's character models and graphical detail.

Gameplay
 
Code Age Brawls was a role-playing video game; players controlled the character Lost L, and the game was split between 2D pre-rendered environments navigated by the player character in 3D, and 3D battle environments. Battles are turn-based and consist of five rounds. Each player must select actions represented by colored badges, with each having strengths and weaknesses to others similar to a rock-paper-scissors mechanic. Once both players have made a selection, the badges are revealed, and the winner does damage to the opposing player based on the difference between their levels. The badge colors are ranked in power from highest to lowest as yellow, red, blue, purple, and gray. If players play the same color they both attack, and if one player's color is higher only they attack. Players may choose to not play a badge in order to save it for later rounds; if both players do not play a badge then neither attacks. After winning a battle, the player gains access to the opponent's form and abilities, equivalent to a character class with themed weapons and equipment, and variations depending on the lead's gender. A chosen form also influences how players can use their badges.

In the original version, alongside single-player combat against computer-driven opponents, network-based multiplayer was incorporated to allow players to compete in one-on-one battles, linking up through matchmaking with nearby phones playing the game. In April 2006, four months after the game was released, Square Enix added the ability to battle other players in addition to the AI. The Battle Arena, an area of the game that allowed three versus three matches between the player and a computer-controlled opponent, was modified to allow matches between two real players. Players could also use their location as a base and team up with others in their location to attack other people's bases.

Synopsis
In an attempt to survive the next Reborn, humanity constructs arks around the Central Code. The plan fails as the arks are struck out of orbit and land back on the ground. Humans come under attack by Otellos, a species that can warp humans into mindless Coded, although some can absorb Coded and transform into powerful warriors dubbed Warhead. Survivors splinter into factions, some fighting each other and others hiding underground.

The game follows Lost L, a human who attempted to become a Coded to survive the Reborn, but is instead transformed into an incomplete Warhead. Due to this condition causing bodily degradation, Lost L must battle other Warheads to steal their bodies. Lost L ends up joining forces with a vigilante group facing off against the hostile Afternova faction, learning about their past and the Ark project along the way. The final chapter focuses on Lost L confronting the leader of Afternova with help from Commanders characters Gene and Meme, and R, a character from Archive with a similar condition to Lost L.

Development
The concept for the Code Age world was created by Yusuke Naora in 2002, prior to the 2003 merger of Square and Enix to become Square Enix. Code Age formed part of Square Enix's plan to develop "polymorphic content", a marketing and sales strategy to "[provide] well-known properties on several platforms, allowing exposure of the products to as wide an audience as possible"; this approach included Compilation of Final Fantasy VII and the World of Mana. Naora's concept was created independent of this policy. Production of the Code Age projects was handled by a group dubbed "Warhead". Gathering the staff together to create the game was a difficult process. Naora acted as producer as he did with Code Age Commanders, co-producing with Takanori Kimura. The director was Toru Osanai, while the character designs were created by Toshiyuki Itahana. The music was composed by Kumi Tanioka, who also worked on Commanders.

Miwa Shoda, who had previously worked on SaGa Frontier and Legend of Mana, wrote the scenario. The storyline of Brawls was interconnected with that of Commanders and Archive to help players understand the full tale and how all the different stories fit together. When creating the gameplay, the team wanted to expand upon the assistance communication used in the Materia System of Before Crisis: Final Fantasy VII. While in the latter game the communication was one way only, Brawls incorporated two-way matchmaking for player battles. The environments were designed in a similar way to Final Fantasy VII and VIII, projecting 3D character models onto 2D pre-rendered backgrounds. Using 3D graphics for the whole game would have put too much strain on the hardware, so 3D environments were reserved for battle sections, with the team still wanting to push the graphical limits of phones. The manga-style story cutscenes were chosen as they best fitted the mobile format.

Release
A trademark for Code Age Brawls was registered by Square Enix in September 2004 alongside other trademarks relating to the Code Age project. The game was simultaneously announced in Japan and shown off at a Square Enix press conference prior to E3 2005 as the third part of the Code Age project with a projected release in 2005. The game was shown off as part of a compilation video detailing the three Code Age projects. As with the Compilation, each project was abbreviated using a lettering formula; "CAA" stood for Archives, "CAC" for Commanders, and "CAB" for Brawls. It was also shown at the Tokyo Game Show in August 2005. A free trial beta test was from November 10 to November 30.

The game released on December 15 for NTT DoCoMo-compatible devices. Code Age Brawls was a subscription-based game, with players needing to pay a monthly fee in order to continue accessing the game. As part its promotion, a lottery campaign was run between its release and January 31, 2006, with the rewards being themed accessories. Players of Commanders could also use a code from that game to gain early access to a rare battle card. Chapter 2 released on January 24, 2006, coming with an additional character class. Chapter 3, which also updated the community site, was released on March 14. A player versus player battle arena was announced for the title starting in late April 2006, along with support for NTT DoCoMo's i-area service that allowed players to find each other using their mobile devices. Chapter 4 was released on May 14. The Final Chapter was released on July 3. While at one point Brawls was reported as having a 2006 North American release planned, Like the other Code Age properties the game went unreleased outside Japan. Brawls closed down on September 30, 2006.

Reception
Western reviewers were impressed by the games trailer reveal before E3 in 2005 with IGN describing it as "stunning", especially noting the games very detailed character models, and GameSpot called it "incredible" for the smooth use of textures. The game demo was felt to be "rich in terms of plot and strategy". Reviewing the initial release, ITMedia praised the combat as refreshing compared to other games on the market, but negatively noted frequent server connection issues during multiplayer matches.

References

2005 video games
Japan-exclusive video games
Mobile games
Role-playing video games
Square Enix games
Video games developed in Japan
Video games scored by Kumi Tanioka